Aphaenops catalonicus is a species of beetle in the subfamily Trechinae. It was described by Escola & Cancio in 1983.

References

catalonicus
Beetles described in 1983